Sam Querrey was the defending champion, but lost in the second round to Egor Gerasimov.

Fabio Fognini won the title, defeating Juan Martín del Potro in the final, 6–4, 6–2.

Seeds
The top four seeds received a bye into the second round.

Draw

Finals

Top half

Bottom half

Qualifying

Seeds

Qualifiers

Lucky loser
  Daniel Elahi Galán

Qualifying draw

First qualifier

Second qualifier

Third qualifier

Fourth qualifier

References

External links
 Main draw
 Qualifying draw

2018 ATP World Tour
2018 Singles